The United States Coast Guard commissioned a new Keeper class of coastal buoy tenders in the 1990s that are 175 feet (53 m) in length and named after lighthouse keepers.

Keeper-class cutters serve the Coast Guard in a variety of missions and are tasked with maintaining aids to navigation (ATON), search and rescue (SAR), law enforcement (LE), migrant interdiction, marine safety inspections, environmental protection and natural resources management.  Keeper-class cutters are also used for light ice breaking operations.

These vessels are 175' long and replaced the World War II era 180', 157' and 133' tenders. The new class of buoy tender cut crew size from 50, 35 and 26, respectively, to 25, saving the already cash-strapped Coast Guard financial and personnel resources.

Keeper-class cutters were built by Marinette Marine of Marinette, WI.

Keeper-class cutters are equipped with mechanical Z-drive azimuth thruster propulsion units instead of the standard propeller and rudder configuration. These mechanical drives are designed to independently rotate 360 degrees. Combined with a thruster in the bow, they enable Keeper-class tenders to dynamically maneuver in a variety of sea states.  This creates an extremely maneuverable platform which, when combined with modern navigation aids such as  GPS, DPS, and ECDIS to allow the Cutter to maintain static positions.  This allows the cutter to precisely place an aid to navigation (ATON).

Keeper-class boarding teams are armed with modern small arms.

List
The following 175-foot WLMs in service (as of 2006):

See also
 USCG seagoing buoy tender
 USCG inland buoy tender
 USCG inland construction tender

Notes

References
 Baker, A. D. The Naval Institute Guide to Combat Fleets of the World 1998–1999. Annapolis, Maryland, USA: Naval Institute Press, 1998. .
 Saunders, Stephen. Jane's Fighting Ships 2002–2003. Coulsdon, UK: Jane's Information Group, 2002. .

Further reading
 Putnam, George R., Lighthouses and Lightships of the United States (Boston: Houghton Mifflin Co., 1933).
 United States Coast Guard, Aids to Navigation (Washington, D.C.: U. S. Government Printing Office, 1945).

External links
 
 Keeper class characteristics

 
Lighthouse keepers
Auxiliary tender classes